The Dexter Collection of Dickensiana is a special collection of materials by, about and associated with the novelist Charles Dickens, donated to the British Library by John Furber Dexter.

References

Archives in the London Borough of Camden
Literature of England
British Library collections
Charles Dickens